Duflo is a French surname. Notable people with the surname include:

 Esther Duflo (born 1972), French-American economist
 Marie Duflo (1940–2019), French mathematician
 Michel Duflo (born 1943), French mathematician

See also
 Duflo isomorphism
 Duflos
 Duflot

French-language surnames